The Tomb of Allama Iqbal, or Mazaar-e-Iqbal is a mausoleum located within the Hazuri Bagh, in the Pakistani city of Lahore, capital of Punjab province.

Background

Iqbal was one of the major inspirations behind the Pakistan Movement, and is revered in Pakistan as Muffakir-e-Pakistan (The Thinker of Pakistan) or Shair-e-Mashriq (The Poet of the East). Iqbal died on 21 April 1938 in Lahore at the age of 60. Thousands of visitors come to the mausoleum every day to pay their respects to the poet-philosopher. It is said that Mustafa Kemal Atatürk sent earth collected from Maulana Rumi's tomb to be sprinkled on this grave

History
Soon after Iqbal's death in April 1938, a committee was formed that was presided over by Chaudhary Mohammed Hussain. 

A major problem in the realisation of this monument was a lack adequate funds. The committee resolved not to accept any donations from the local governments and state rulers, and so funds were raised through the contributions from Iqbal's friends, admirers and disciples.

Architecture
The architecture has a combination of styles however it reflects mainly the Mughal style. The structure is entirely constructed of red sandstone, which was brought from Jaipur, British India,  and building marble from Makrana, Rajputana. After the independence of Pakistan in 1947, construction was affected due to export restrictions of red stone from India. Six couplets of a ghazal are carved from Iqbal's poetical work Zabur-e-Ajam (Persian Psalms) on the mausoleum's interior surfaces. Outside, there is a small garden, distributed into small plots. The mausoleum was designed by Hyderabad Deccan's then Chief Architect, Nawab Zain Yar Jang Bahadur and took thirteen years to build at a cost of about one hundred thousand (Rs. 100,000) Pakistani rupees. The major reason for delay was the stoppage of red-stone from Jaipur in post-independence India.

Grave and cenotaph
The rectangular mausoleum has two gates at the eastern and southern side respectively, inlaid with marble, while the cenotaph itself is made of white marble. The tombstone was a gift from the people of Afghanistan, and is made of lapis lazuli and inscribed with Quranic verses in calligraphy inscribed in Afghanistan.

Conservation
The tomb complex is listed on the Protected Heritage Monuments of the Archaeology Department of Punjab.

Gallery

See also 
Tomb of Asif Khan
Tomb of Jahangir
Tomb of Nur Jahan
Architecture portal
Iqbaliat
Category:Iqbal scholars
List of mausolea

References

External links 

Iqbal Databank
Tombs in Pakistan
3D Model of Tomb 

Architecture of Lahore
Mausoleums in Punjab, Pakistan
Memorials to Muhammad Iqbal
Indo-Islamic architecture
Walled City of Lahore
Tourist attractions in Lahore
Tombs in Lahore